The 2019-20 Canisius Golden Griffins men's ice hockey season was the 40th season of play for the program, the 22nd at the Division I level, and the 17th season in the Atlantic Hockey conference. The Golden Griffins represented Canisius College and were coached by Trevor Large, in his 3rd season.

Current roster

As of September 3, 2019.

Standings

Schedule and Results

|-
!colspan=12 style=";" | Regular Season

|-
!colspan=12 style=";" | 

|- align="center" bgcolor="#e0e0e0"
|colspan=12|Canisius Lost Series 0–2

Scoring Statistics

Goaltending statistics

† Barczewski and Ladd both played in the shutout on February 29.

Rankings

References

Canisius Golden Griffins men's ice hockey seasons
Canisius Golden Griffins
Canisius Golden Griffins
2019 in sports in New York (state)
2020 in sports in New York (state)